One Drop East is the fifth studio album by New Zealand dub group, Salmonella Dub released in 2003.  The album was re-released as a double edition remix album, titled One Drop East + Remixes & Outtakes.

Track listing
One Drop East
"Longtime"
"Slide"
"Dancehall Girl"
"Nu Steppa"
"Dub Survivor"
"Ez On"
"Octopus"
"Simmer Down"
"Pure"
"Bubble"

One Drop East + Remixes & Outtakes

Disc one
"Longtime"
"Slide"
"Dancehall Girl"
"Nu Steppa"
"Dub Survivor"
"Ez On"
"Octopus"
"Simmer Down"
"Pure"
"Bubble"

Disc two
"Longtime" (Sativa Records Remix) featuring MC YT
"Mercy (Mu Remix)"
"Slide (Radio Cut)"
"Ez On (Concord Dawn Remix)"
"Dancehall Girl (Jagwah Mix)"
"DnB and the Doppla Effect"
"Nu Steppa (Nat Clarxon and DJ Digital Remix)"
"Funky Unky Meets Kill Bill"
"Mercy (Mad Professor Mix)"

Charts

Certifications

References

Salmonella Dub albums
2004 albums